The 2011 Pacific Games women's football tournament was the third edition of Pacific Games women's football tournament. The competition was held in New Caledonia from 27 August to 9 September 2011 with the final played at the Stade Numa-Daly in Nouméa.

Nine women's teams competed at the Games.

Participants

Format
The 9 teams were placed into 2 groups. The first two teams advanced to the semifinals.

Preliminary round

Group A

Group B

Knockout stage

Bracket

Semi-finals

Third place game

Final

Goalscorers
12 goals
 Christelle Wahnawe

5 goals
 Sandra Birum

3 goals

 Laydah Samani
 Rumona Morris
 Salome Va'enuku

2 goals

 Kim Maguire
 Miriam Lanta
 Ara Midi
 Mohea Hauata

1 goal

 Dayna Napa
 Tepaeru Toka
 Laijipa Daini
 Lota Francis
 Stella Naivalulevu
 Viniana Riwai
 Priya Singh
 Jannel Banks
 Kristin Thompson
 Marjorie Pouye
 Celine Xolawawa
 Miriam Louma
 Linah Honeakii
 Janie Nori
 Deslyn Siniu
 Betty Maenu'u
 Heimiri Alvarez
 Tiere Apo
 Adriana Frelin
 Tihani Tokoragi
 Piuingi Feke
 Sofia Filo
 Laite Si'i Manu

Own goal
 Fiso Letoi (playing against Papua New Guinea)

See also
Men's football at the 2011 Pacific Games
Pacific Games

References

Football at the 2011 Pacific Games
PAc

Football at the Pacific Games